Ivor Canavan, OBE (1929–1999) was a politician in Northern Ireland during the Troubles.

On leaving St Columb's College, Canavan studied Engineering at University College Dublin.  He returned to his native Derry in 1959 and commenced a lifelong career with Du Pont.  In the context of a deepening political crisis, Canavan became an active member of the Alliance Party of Northern Ireland shortly after its 1970 inception.

Ivor Canavan was elected to Londonderry City Council in 1973.  In December that year, he took part in the negotiations that culminated in the Sunningdale Agreement. Canavan was elected Deputy Mayor of Londonderry in 1974 and, the following year, became the first and only Alliance Mayor of Londonderry.

In May 1976, the Canavan family home was bombed. The Provisional IRA claimed responsibility. No one was in the house at the time of the blast. Canavan served as Chairman of the Police Authority (NI) Complaints Committee. from 1977-79. He resigned from this post and retired from active politics to take up a position with DuPont in Geneva, Switzerland.

Ivor Canavan was appointed an OBE in 1980 for public services in Northern Ireland. Canavan's brother Michael was a prominent member of the Social Democratic and Labour Party.

References

1929 births
1999 deaths
Alliance Party of Northern Ireland politicians
Alumni of University College Dublin
Councillors in Derry (city)
Date of birth missing
Date of death missing
Officers of the Order of the British Empire
People educated at St Columb's College
Mayors of Derry
Alliance Party of Northern Ireland councillors